Sturbridge is a neighborhood in West Little Rock developed in the 1960s. 

Neighborhoods in Little Rock, Arkansas